Marzio Scholten (born in Granollers, Spain, 17 June 1982) is a Dutch jazz guitarist and composer.

Biography
He is regarded as one of the leading modern jazz guitarists and composers of the Netherlands. His Marzio Scholten Group is popular in the Dutch modern jazz scene.

In June 2008, after graduating from the Amsterdam Conservatory two years earlier, he released his debut album, Motherland. In 2009 he was nominated for the Deloitte Jazz Award.

His second album, World of Thought, was released in October 2010 and received reviews worldwide. The same reviewer selected World of Thought as one of the best international releases of 2010. In the Netherlands World of Thought ended up in the Top 10 best jazz releases that year.

In May 2012 Scholten released his third album, Voids, Echoes and Whispers, which received positive reviews in the Netherlands, U.S., and Japan, where the readers of Tokyo Jazz Notes selected Voids, Echoes and Whispers as  runner-up in the category Best International Jazz Album of 2012.

Scholten has performed at the North Sea Jazz Festival, Bimhuis, Muziekcentrum Vredenburg, Royal Theatre Carré and The Hague Jazz.

Scholten's bands, Marzio Scholten Group/Marzio Scholten Quartet, consist of Yaniv Nachum (saxophone), Randal Corsen (piano), Stefan Lievestro (double bass), and Mark Schilders (drums). Compositions are written and arranged by guitarist and bandleader Scholten. Improvisation is important, as well as the mixing of modern jazz with other genres. Scholten's music can be described as modern creative jazz.

Discography

As leader
 2008: Motherland (O.A.P.)
 2010: World of Thought (O.A.P.)
 2012: Voids, Echoes and Whispers (self-produced)
 2013: Garage Moi (self-produced)
 2015: Here Comes A Riot (self-produced)
 2016: Hymn - single (self-produced)
 2017: We Never Left Town (self-produced)
 2018: A Real Life Photograph (Vol.1) (self-produced)
 2019: Isolophilia (self-produced)

As a sideman
 2010: Patches of Blue, Marike van Dijk
 2011: Flow, Iman Spaargaren Quartet & Septet

References

External links
 Official site

Dutch jazz guitarists
Dutch male guitarists
1982 births
Living people
People from Granollers
21st-century guitarists
21st-century male musicians
Male jazz musicians